Magyar Fehér Bor (literally Hungarian white wine) is a Hungarian medium sweet white wine that Alko, a state-owned Finnish alcoholic beverage retailing monopoly, has bottled and sold since 1935. Since 1999 the bottling is done by Altia. It is the most popular white wine in Finland; it is widely used for social drinking for its relative quality, cheap price and accessibility. For decades Magyar Fehér Bor has been a popular drink among students and the youth. "Magyar Fehér Bor" is a Finnish brand name and has many nicknames of which "Magis" or "Makkis" are the most used.

References

External links
 Alko listing

Hungarian wine